The 1931 All-Ireland Senior Football Championship was the 45th staging of Ireland's premier Gaelic football knock-out competition. Kerry were the winners.

Results

Connacht Senior Football Championship

Leinster Senior Football Championship

Munster Senior Football Championship

Ulster Senior Football Championship

An objection was made and the game awarded to Antrim.

All-Ireland Senior Football Championship

Championship statistics

Miscellaneous

 Castlebar's pitch becomes known as McHale after John MacHale.
 Kilkenny withdraw from Leinster Championship until 1943.
 Westmeath beat Dublin for the first time ever.
 Kerry become the first Munster team to be All Ireland champions for 3 years in a row.

References